The 2004 Tour de Hongrie was the 31st edition of the Tour de Hongrie cycle race and was held from 26 July to 1 August 2004. The race started in Veszprém and finished in Budapest. The race was won by Zoltán Remák.

General classification

References

2004
Tour de Hongrie
Tour de Hongrie